Sarcophilus is a genus of carnivorous marsupial best known for its only living member, the Tasmanian devil. Sarcophilus is Latin - meaning 'flesh-loving'. 

There are four species of Sarcophilus. S. laniarius and S. moornaensis are only known from fossils from the Pleistocene. S. laniarius was larger than the contemporary, and only surviving, species S. harrisii, weighing up to 10 kilograms more. The relationship between the four species is unclear; while some have proposed that S. harrisii may be a dwarf version of S. laniarius, others argue that it is a completely different species and that the two may have coexisted during the Pleistocene.

References 

 Long, J., Archer, M., Flannery, T. and Hand, S. 2002. Prehistoric Mammals of Australia and New Guinea: One Hundred Million Years of Evolution. Johns Hopkins University Press.  pp 55. .

Dasyuromorphs
Marsupial genera
Mammal genera with one living species
Extant Pleistocene first appearances
Taxa named by Frédéric Cuvier